Harvey Adam Surface (July 25, 1867 – July 18, 1941) was an American zoologist.  He was for 15 years Economic Zoologist for the  Pennsylvania Department of Agriculture, and later served three terms in the state legislature. Born in Waynesville, Ohio to a prominent farming family, he graduated from Ohio State University in 1891, and earned a M.S. the following year. After teaching at University of the Pacific and Cornell, he became Professor of Zoology at Pennsylvania State College (1900–1907), and Professor of Biology at Susquehanna University (1920–1930). His work focused on the wildlife and plants of Pennsylvania.  He was ornithological editor of American Gardening, nature study editor of Popular Educator, member of the American Association for the Advancement of Science, Pennsylvania Academy of Science, and Pennsylvania Audubon Society, and was president of the Pennsylvania Beekeeper’s Association for 18 years. In 1931 he was elected to the Pennsylvania House of Representatives as Representative from Snyder County, where he served until 1936.

References

External links

1867 births
1941 deaths
20th-century American zoologists
Members of the Pennsylvania House of Representatives
People from Waynesville, Ohio
Ohio State University alumni
Pennsylvania State University faculty
Susquehanna University faculty
Scientists from Pennsylvania
Cornell University faculty